Dance Magazine's "25 to Watch" is an annual list published by Dance Magazine of leading young dancers and choreographers, as well as new dance companies and trends in dance.  The list is printed in the January issue of the magazine each year.

2021 
"25 to Watch" for 2021:

	Keerati Jinakunwiphat
	Laura Morton
	Aaron Samuel Davis
	Vincenzo Di Primo
	Bianca Scudamore
	Amanda Morgan
	Gaby Diaz
	Rohan Bhargava
	Raianna Brown
	Leonardo Sandoval
	Boston Dance Theater
	Sorah Yang
	Project Home
	Rebecca Margolick
	Rhodnie Désir
	Paula Comitre
	Christine Flores
	Khoudia Touré
	DeMarco Sleeper
	Oona Doherty
	Kennedy Brown
	Melanie Greene and J. Bouey
	Yesenia Ayala
	Nia-Amina Minor
	Maria Coelho

2020 
"25 to Watch" for 2020:

	Gabrielle Hamilton
	LED
	Maya Taylor
	Luke Hickey
	Annie Morgan
	Ashley Yergens
	Abdiel Figueroa Reyes
	Jay Carlon
	Hannah Garner
	Joseph Sissens
	Luis Beltran
	Joyce Edwards
	Zenon Zubyk
	Julie Crothers
	Lizzie Tripp
	Tatiana Desardouin
	Tommie Kesten
	Zimmi Coker
	Mira Nadon
	Khalia Campbell
	Maya Man
	Kara Chan
	Tobias Praetorius
	Airi Igarashi
	Oluwadamilare "Dare" Ayorinde

2019 
"25 to Watch" for 2019:

	Evan Ruggiero
	Siphesihle November
	Sophie Miklosovic
	Micaela Taylor
	Aran Bell
	Nic Gareiss
	Chisako Oga
	Maria Khoreva
	Roman Mejia
	Benjamin Freemantle
	Pioneer Winter Collective
	Wubkje Kuindersma
	Adeene Denton
	Tanya Chianese
	Jessica He
	Joshua Culbreath
	Jasmine Harper
	Sydney Dolan
	Cristina Hall
	Shamar Wayne Watt
	Paul Morland
	Easton Payne
	Hadar Ahuvia
	Matty Davis
	Stephanie Troyak

2018 
"25 to Watch" for 2018:

	Eduardo Guerrero
	Angelo Greco
	Alanna Morris-Van Tassel
	Erica Lall
	Alston Macgill
	Raven Barkley
	Leal Zielińska
	Kelsey McCowan & Caley Carr
	Annie Arnoult
	slowdanger
	Cesar Corrales
	May Nagahisa
	Connie Shiau
	MK Abadoo
	Sam Pinkleton
	Daina Ashbee
	Mackenzie Richter
	Marcelino Sambé
	Maine Kawashima
	Yeman Brown
	Kate Ladenheim
	Jacob Jonas
	Kolton Krouse
	Jeroboam Bozeman
	Alice Klock

2017 
"25 to Watch" for 2017:

	Unity Phelan
	Shimon Ito
	Amanda DeVenuta
	Jeffery Duffy
	Chun Wai Chan
	Paige Fraser
	Parris Goebel
	Elise Cowin
	Kayla Collymore
	Elizabeth Wallace
	Omari Mizrahi
	Jess LeProtto
	Karissa Royster
	Reed Tankersley
	Chitra Vairavan
	Mario Bermudez Gil
	Zhiyao Zhang
	Marc Crousillat
	Martha Nichols
	Sirui Liu
	Sarah Lapointe
	Meg Foley
	Ching Ching Wong
	Charlotte Edmonds
	Margarita Shrainer

2016 
"25 to Watch" for 2016:

	Jovani Furlan
	Cora Cliburn
	Kaleen Miller
	Francesco Gabriele Frola
	Miriam Miller
	Renata Shakirova
	Sterling Baca
	Katarzyna Skarpetowska
	Alex Sanchez
	Jim Nowakowski
	Shahar Dori
	Myles Thatcher
	Janelle Figgins
	Caitlin Cucchiara
	Jacquelin Harris
	Litebulb
	Caitlin Trainor
	Norbert De La Cruz III
	Tamisha Guy
	Léonore Baulac
	Kiara Flder
	MADBOOTS DANCE
	Hiroki Ichinose
	Michelle Veintimilla
	Nayara Lopes

2015 
"25 to Watch" for 2015:

	Emilie Leriche
	Andrew Bartee
	Silas Farley
	Jaclyn Walsh
	Alyssa Mann
	Kate Wallich
	Tale Dolven
	Chyrstyn Fentroy
	Shiori Kase
	Osnel Delgado
	Joshua L. Peugh
	Visceral Dance Chicago
	Ana Turazashvili
	Skylar Campbell
	François Alu
	Stephanie Williams
	Danica Paulos
	Indya Childs
	Ida Praetorius
	Ryan P Casey
	Robyn Mineko Williams
	Stuart Singer
	Jay Armstrong Johnson
	Danielle Agami

2014 
"25 to Watch" for 2014:

 Sep Hye Han
 The Nexus Project
 Ryan Steelee
 Heath Gill
 Danielle Hammer
 Tomomi Morimoto
 Megan Zimny Kaftira
 Javier Ninja
 Demi Remick
 Laura Gutierrez
 Travis Walker
 Christy Funsch
 Da' Von Doane
 Chelsea Adomaitis
 Dylan Gutierrez
 Melissa Toogood
 Jennifer Lauren
 Nic Lincoln
 Kristina Kretova
 Indiana Woodward
 Yoshiaki Nakano
 Demetia Hopkins
 Calvin Royal III
 Mary Ann Bradley
 Derek Dunn

2013 
"25 to Watch" for 2013:

	Emily Kikta
	Johnny McMillan
	Michael Montgomery
	Frederick (Pete) Leo Walker II
	Olga Smirnova
	Kayla Rowser
	Victor Alexander
	Rashaun Mitchell and Silas Riener
	Cassandra Trenary
	Claire Calvert
	Juel D. Lane
	Alan Obuzor
	Melinda Sullivan
	Nozomi Iijima
	Monica Cervantes
	Ida Saki
	Jonathan Royse Windham
	Amanda Cochrane
	BODYTRAFFIC
	Leta Biasucci
	Ballet BC
	Bryan Strimpel
	Gregory Haney
	The Playground
	Frances Chiaverini

2012 
"25 to Watch" for 2012:

 Ana Lopez
 Caleb Teicher
 Keenan Kampa
 Yonah Acosta
 August Wilson Center Dance Ensemble
 Kleber Rebello
 Courtney D. Jones
 Anna Tikhomirova
 Micah Moch
 tEEth
 Courtney Muscroft
 Danielle Rowe
 Tzveta Kassabova
 Marlon Taylor-Wiles
 Brooklyn Mack
 Katherine Williams
 Lil Buck
 Carrie Hanson
 Price Suddarth
 Beth Gill
 Zack Tang
 Rachel Van Buskirk
 Taylor Stanley
 Eun Jung Choi
 Gustavo Ramírez Sansano

2011 
"25 to Watch" for 2011:

 Jerome Tisserand
 Roberto Cisneros
 Isaac Akiba
 Renan Cerdeiro
 Leann Underwood
 Whitney Huell
 Julianne Kepley
 Brittany Pollack
 Melissa Hamilton
 Allison Miller
 Adam Hougland
 Olivier Wevers
 Robert Dekkers
 Yannick Lebrun
 Ryoji Sasamoto
 Ahmed Khemis
 Nikki Zialcita
 Troy Ogilvie
 Emily Schoen
 Jonathan Fredrickson
 Huang Yi
 Luciana Achugar
 Alexandria "Brinae Ali" Bradley
 Teddy Forance
 Nick Kenkel

2010 
"25 to Watch" for 2010:

 Robert Fairchild
 Julia Rhoads
 Adrienne Benz
 Maeghan McHale
 Lloyd Knight
 Isaac Hernández
 Sheryl Murakami
 Company C Contemporary Ballet
 Irina Tsikurishvili
 Claudia Rahardjanoto
 Ekaterina Krysanova
 Nelly van Bommel
 Iyar Elezra
 Alex Wong
 Jessika Muns
 Pearlann Porter
 Aparna Ramaswamy
 William Wingfield
 Rumpus Room
 Emily Proctor
 Caine Keenan
 Eric Tamm
 Sean Dorsey
 Judith Sanchez Ruiz
 Whitney Jensen

2009 
"25 to Watch" for 2009:

 Ballet Nouveau Colorado
 Melissa Thomas 
 Leslie Kraus (of Kate Weare Company)
 Sarah Reynolds
 Edwin Aparicio
 Manuelito Biag
 Rachel Piskin
 Kyle Abraham
 Sonya Tayeh
 Ricardo Zayas
 Francisco Graciano
 Kiesha Lalama-White
 Andrea Miller / Gallim Dance 
 Jessica Tong
 Sarah Reich
 Christopher Vo
 Megan Quiroz
 Kara Wilkes
 Seth Stewart
 Marideth Wanat
 Jessica Collado
 Lux Boreal
 Ginger Smith
 Eric Underwood
 Rachel Foster

2008 
"25 to Watch" for 2008:

 Sarawanee Tanatanit
 Kinodance Company
 Cedar Lake Contemporary Ballet
 Dawn Dipple
 Lorraine Chapman
 Kendrick Jones
 Tyler Angle
 Natalie Cortez
 Exhale Dance Tribe
 Mathew Janczewski and Arena Dances
 Michela Marino Lerman
 Diana Albrecht
 Charles O. Anderson and Dance Theatre X
 Carolyn Rose Ramsay
 Penny Saunders
 Ekaterina Kondaurova
 Sharna Fabiano
 Kumiko Tsuji
 Celestina
 Noah Racey
 Mara Vinson
 Ivan Vasiliev
 Chase Johnsey
 Faye Driscoll
 Shinichi Iova-Koga

2007 
"25 to Watch" for 2007:

 Dawn Fay 
 Meisha Bosma
 Columbus Movement Movement (cm2)
 Natalia Osipova
 Kenta Shimizu
 Grease on Reality TV
 Attack Theatre
 Webdance  (dance videos on the internet)
 Tiit Helimets 
 Vivian Nixon
 Ephrat Asherie
 Nelida Tirado
 Holly Johnston
 Zane Booker
 Peng-Yu Chen
 Peggy Dolkas
 The Jacqueline Kennedy Onassis School at ABT
 Chris Elam: Misnomer Dance Theater
 Helen Pickett
 Sean Patrick Mahoney
 Lauri Stallings
 Rulan Tangen
 Max Pollak
 Jamar Roberts
 Melody Herrera

2006 
"25 to Watch" for 2006:

 "Cricket" (James P. Colter)
 Anouk van Dijk
 Caitlin Valentine
 Kurt Douglas
 Tania Isaac
 Aesha Ash
 Ma Cong
 Navarrete x Kajiyama Dance Theater
 Edwaard Liang 
 Ballet Pacifica 
 Josie Walsh
 Carla Körbes
 Lisa Benson
 Dance Camera West Film Festival
 Hee Seo
 Mariko Kida
 Leticia Oliveira
 Jonah Bokaer
 Isaac Spencer
 Misa Kuranaga
 Miguel Gutierrez
 Yevgenia Obraztsova
 Amar Ramasar
 This Woman's Work
 Kazu Kumagai

2005 
"25 to Watch" for 2005:

 Fang-Yi Sheu
 Danny Tidwell
 Avichai Scher
 Uri Sands
 Szabolcs Varga
 Maria Gillespie
 Nancy Lemenager
 Nutnaree Pipit-Suksan
 Yoon-Jeong Jin
 Fin Walker
 Mark Dendy
 Mikhail Ilyin
 Brian Reeder
 Scott Wells 
 Amy Seiwert 
 Natalia Magnicaballi
 Kristi Boone
 William Cannon
 Teresa Reichlen
 Nejla Y. Yatkin 
 Erik Kaiel
 Domingo Rubio
 Kristen Foote
 Kathi Martuza
 Motaz Kabbani

2004 
"25 to Watch" for 2004:

 George Piper Dances 
 Noémie Lafrance
 Benjamin Levy
 Dominic Walsh Dance Theater
 Stella Abrera
 David Hallberg 
 Verb Ballets 
 Cathy Marston
 Matjash Mrozewski
 Nicolas Blanc
 Viengsay Valdes
 Revealing the Emotional Body (works by New York choreographers Aviva Geismar, Fiona Marcotty, Mollie O'Brien, and RoseAnne Spradlin)
 Emily Patterson
 Janice Garrett
 Seth Orza 
 Peter Boal and Company 
 Jason Samuels-Smith
 Margie Gillis
 Erick Montes
 Bradon McDonald
 Paulette Beauchamp
 Train Wreck Dance Company 
 Vincent Mantsoe
 Larry Keigwin
 Christopher Stowell

2003 
"25 to Watch" for 2003:

 Bahiyah Sayyed-Gaines
 Jerry Mitchell
 Tamieca McCloud
 Taryn Kaschock
 Veronika Part
 Christopher Hampson
 Jamie Farquhar
 Johannes Wieland
 The Foundry's
 Sduduzo Ka-Mbili
 Misty Copeland
 Diane Coburn Bruning
 Narrative Ballets (as a rising genre; choreographers Paul Vasterling, Trey McIntyre, Todd Bolender)
 Justin Jones and Chris Yon
 Les Ballets Jazz de Montreal 
 Daisuke Takeuchi
 Henri Oguike
 Ruben Martin
 Carrie Imler
 CityDance Ensemble
 Irina Golub
 Jose Mateo
 Alexandra Ansanelli
 Amanda Miller
 Guillaume Cote

2002 
"25 to Watch" for 2002:

 Akram Khan
 Mariellen Olson
 Andrian Fadeyev
 Genevieve Guerard
 Thaddeus Davis
 Melissa Barak 
 Sonya Delwaide
 Maia Wilkins
 David Shimotakahara
 Roxane Butterfly
 Gillian Murphy
 Jorden Morris
 Philadelphia (as an up-and-coming city for dance)
 Wade Robson
 Anita Sun Pacylowski
 Tamar Rogoff
 Sean Steward
 Chica Mori
 Cleo Mack
 Sarah Hughes
 Tony Powell
 Alison Roper
 Ashley Canterna
 Nicholas Leichter
 Williamsburg (as an artistic community)

2001 
"25 to Watch" for 2001:

 Xiao Nan Yu
 Calvin Kitten
 Shawn Bowen
 Michael Moschen
 3 point juncture (choreographers Yanira Castro, Tiffany Mills, and Pam Tanowitz)
 Yasuko Yokoshi and Gonnie Heggen
 T.J. Espinoza
 The Young Hoofers (Traci Mann)
 Kaori Nakamura
 Adam Hendrickson
 Daniel Ulbricht
 Marcelo Gomes
 Daniel Marshall
 Richard Move
 Retail Dance (choreographer Kim Shipp)
 Ashley Bouder
 Paule Turner
 Wayne McGregor
 Caroline Rocher
 Li Chiao-Ping
 Bill "Crutchmaster" Shannon
 Kyra Nichols
 Dancewear's Junction: Fashion, Function (towards more stylish dance clothes)
 Paul S. Abrahamson
 Miami City Ballet

References

 
 
Dance awards